The 1951 Ontario general election was held on November 22, 1951, to elect the 90 members of the 24th Legislative Assembly of Ontario (Members of Provincial Parliament, or "MPPs") of the Province of Ontario.

The Ontario Progressive Conservative Party, led by Leslie Frost, won a fourth consecutive term in office, increasing its caucus in the legislature from 53 in the previous election to 79—a solid majority.

The Ontario Liberal Party, led by Walter Thomson, lost six seats, but regained the role of official opposition because of the collapse of the CCF vote. Albert Wren was elected as a Liberal-Labour candidate and sat with the Liberal caucus.

The social democratic Co-operative Commonwealth Federation (CCF), led by Ted Jolliffe, lost all but two of its previous 21 seats with Jolliffe himself being defeated in the riding of York South.

One seat was won by J.B. Salsberg of the Labor-Progressive Party (which was the Communist Party of Ontario). LPP leader A.A. MacLeod lost his downtown Toronto seat of Bellwoods in this election and three other LPP candidates were also defeated.

Results

|-
! colspan=2 rowspan=2 | Political party
! rowspan=2 | Party leader
! colspan=5 | MPPs
! colspan=3 | Votes
|-
! Candidates
!1948
!Dissol.
!1951
!±
!#
!%
! ± (pp)

|style="text-align:left;"|Leslie Frost
|90
|53
|53
|79
|26
|860,939
|48.46%
|7.18

|style="text-align:left;"|Walter Thomson
|88
|13
|13
|7
|6
|551,753
|31.06%
|1.72

|style="text-align:left;"|Ted Jolliffe
|77
|21
|21
|2
|19
|339,362
|19.10%
|7.42

|style="text-align:left;"|Stewart Smith
|6
|2
|2
|1
|1
|11,914
|0.67%
|0.33

|style="text-align:left;"|
|2
|1
|1
|1
|
|7,939
|0.45%
|0.01

|style="text-align:left;"|
|4
|–
|–
|–
|
|1,869
|0.11%
|0.01

|style="text-align:left;"|
|1
|–
|–
|–
|
|1,375
|0.08%
|

|style="text-align:left;"|
|2
|–
|–
|–
|
|1,094
|0.06%
|0.13

|style="text-align:left;"|Socialist-Labour
|style="text-align:left;"|
|1
|–
|–
|–
|
|371
|0.02%
|0.03

|style="text-align:left;"|
|–
|–
|–
|–
|
|colspan="3"|Did not campaign

|
|–
|–
|–
|–
|
|colspan="3"|Did not campaign

|style="text-align:left;"|
|–
|–
|–
|–
|
|colspan="3"|Did not campaign

|style="text-align:left;"|
|–
|–
|–
|–
|
|colspan="3"|Did not campaign

|colspan="3"|
|
|colspan="5"|
|-style="background:#E9E9E9;"
|colspan="3" style="text-align:left;"|Total
|271
|90
|90
|90
|
|1,776,616
|100.00%
|
|-
|colspan="8" style="text-align:left;"|Blank and invalid ballots
|align="right"|23,834
|style="background:#E9E9E9;" colspan="2"|
|-style="background:#E9E9E9;"
|colspan="8" style="text-align:left;"|Registered voters / turnout
|2,745,709
|65.57%
|2.09
|}

Seats that changed hands

There were 29 seats that changed allegiance in the election.

 CCF to PC
Beaches
Bracondale
Dovercourt
Hamilton Centre
Hamilton East
High Park
Parkdale
Port Arthur
Riverdale
Sault Ste. Marie
St. David
Timiskaming
Waterloo South
Wentworth
Woodbine
York East
York South
York West

 CCF to Liberal
Essex North

 PC to Liberal
Stormont

 PC to Liberal-Labour
Kenora

 Liberal to PC
Bruce
Fort William
Kent East
London
Prince Edward—Lennox
Waterloo North
Welland
Wellington North

 Labor-Progressive to PC
Bellwoods

 Liberal-Labour to PC
Rainy River

See also
Politics of Ontario
List of Ontario political parties
Premier of Ontario
Leader of the Opposition (Ontario)

References

1951 elections in Canada
1951
1951 in Ontario
November 1951 events in Canada